Esteghlal or Esteqlal is a Persian word meaning independence. It is used as a prefix by many Iranian association football clubs and Armenian football clubs. This includes:
 Esteghlal F.C. – Iranian football club
 Esteghlal Ahvaz F.C. – Iranian football club
 Esteghlal Meli-Sanati Khuzestan F.C. – Iranian football club
 Esteghlal Bandar Anzali F.C. – Iranian football club
 Esteghlal Ardabil F.C. – Iranian football club
 Esteghlal Bojnurd F.C. – Iranian football club
 Esteghlal Buer Ahmad F.C. – Iranian football club
 Esteghlal Dushanbe – Tajikistani football club
 Esteghlal Tashkent — Uzbekistani football club
 Esteghlal Kish F.C. – defunct Iranian football club
 Esteghlal-Kotayk Abovian – Armenian football club
 Esteghlal Rasht F.C. – defunct Iranian football club
 Esteghlal Takestan F.C. – Iranian football club
 Esteghlal Iravan F.C. – Armenian football club

See also
 Istiqlal (disambiguation)